The Archdiocese of Lucca is a Latin Church ecclesiastical territory or diocese of the Catholic Church in Italy. The diocese dates back as a diocese to the 1st century; it became an archdiocese in 1726. The episcopal see is Lucca. It is not a metropolitan see, has no suffragan dioceses, and is exempt directly to the Holy See.

History
During the Gothic Wars the city of Lucca was besieged and taken by Totila in 550. Hoping for assistance from the Franks, the Lucchesi obstinately resisted the attack of Narses, surrendering only after a siege of seven months (553). It later fell into the hands of the Lombards, was thenceforward a place of great importance, and became the favourite seat of the Marquesses of Tuscany.

In 981 Otto II, Holy Roman Emperor bestowed on its bishop civil jurisdiction over the entire diocesan territory; but in 1081 Emperor Henry IV made it a free city and conferred other favours upon it, especially in the way of trade. This was the origin of the Republic of Lucca. Lucca was generally on the side of the pope against the emperor, and hence joined the League of S. Ginesio (1197).

There is a legend that the Gospel was preached at Lucca by St. Paulinus, a disciple of St. Peter, and the discovery in 1197 of a stone, recording the deposition of the relics of Paulinus, a holy martyr, apparently confirmed this  belief. On the stone, however, St. Paulinus is not called Bishop of Lucca, nor is there any allusion to his having lived in Apostolic times.

The first bishop of certain date is Maximus, present at the Council of Sardica (343). At the Council of Rimini (359), Paulinus, Bishop of Lucca, was present. Perhaps the above-mentioned legend arose through a repetition of this Paulinus. Remarkable for sanctity and miracles was St. Fridianus (Frediano) (560–588), son of Ultonius, King of Ireland, or perhaps of a king of Ulster (Ultonia), of whom in his "Dialogues" (III, 10) Gregory the Great relates a miracle.

In 739, during the episcopate of Walprandus, Richard, King of the Angles and father of the Saints Willibald, Wunibald, and Walburga, died at Lucca and was buried in the church of S. Frediano. Under Blessed Giovanni (787) it is said the Volto Santo was brought to Lucca. Other bishops were:

Anselmo Badagio (1073), later Pope Alexander II;
succeeded as bishop by his nephew Anselm of Lucca, a noted writer;
Apizio (1227), under whom Lucca was deprived of its episcopal see for six years by Pope Gregory IX;
the Franciscan Giovanni Salvuzzi (1383), who built the episcopal palace;
Nicolò Guinigi (1394), exiled by his relative Paolo Guinigi, Lord of Lucca.

In 1408 Pope Gregory XII went to Lucca to come to a personal agreement with the antipope Benedict XIII, and was there abandoned by his cardinals.

Also:
 the writer Felino Maria Sandeo (1499), nephew of Ariosto;
Cardinal Sisto della Rovere (1508);
Cardinal Francesco Sforza Riario (1517)
Cardinal Bartolommeo Guidiccioni (1605), under whom the Diocese of San Miniato was formed and separated from Lucca;
Cardinal Girolamo Bonvisi (1657);
Bernardino Guinigi (1723), the first archbishop (1726);
the scholar Gian Domenico Mansi (1764–1769);
Benedetto Lorenzelli (1904-1910), last nuncio to Paris before the separation (resigned as nuncio to France in 1904) (Cardinal in 1907).

Parishes
The archdiocese has a total of 362 parishes, all of which fall within the (civil) region of Tuscany. 354 are in the Province of Lucca and 8 in the Province of Pistoia. For a listing of parishes by province and commune see List of parishes of the Roman Catholic Archdiocese of Lucca.

See also
 Timeline of Lucca

Notes and references

Bibliography

 Guidi, P. "Serie cronologica dei vescovi e degli arcivescovi di Lucca," Schola Clericorum et Cura Animarum, Vol. V, 1905, to Vol. XI, 1911. Lucca. 
 Nicolai, U. (1966). I vescovi di Lucca. Lucca, 1966.

External links
 Benigni, Umberto. "Lucca." The Catholic Encyclopedia. Vol. 9. New York: Robert Appleton Company, 1910. Retrieved: 23 November 2019.
 List of bishops

Lucca
Province of Lucca
Province of Pistoia
Lucca
Lucca